QVC UK is a television shopping channel broadcast from the United Kingdom to the United Kingdom and Ireland. It was formed in 1993 when QVC, Inc. agreed to a deal with Sky TV to create a UK version of the US channel. "QVC – The Shopping Channel" first broadcast in the UK on 1 October 1993.

History
The original US channel was founded in 1986 in West Chester, Pennsylvania by Joseph Segel. It grew into a multinational corporation, specialising in televised home shopping. It now broadcasts in five countries to 141 million consumers. The name is an initialism—standing for Quality, Value, Convenience. However, unlike in the US, the expansion of the initialism is no longer used on air in the UK.

The UK venture launched on 1 October 1993, becoming the UK's first full-time home shopping channel and in 1998 the UK venture turned its first net profit (£12.5 million), against a loss of £228,000 in 1997. Originally 20% owned by Sky, it became a wholly owned subsidiary of the US broadcaster in 2004.

In 2008 QVC UK launched a multiscreen video service accessible via the interactive television layer, making three video streams available to Sky viewers via the red button:
QVC Live
QVC+1 (a time delayed service)
Today's Special Value presentation

In February 2020, QVC UK had a whole new rebrand with a whole new logo.

QVC Beauty
On 26 October 2010 a second channel was launched in the UK, QVC Beauty, available to viewers of Freeview, Sky and Freesat.

The channel broadcasts from 4:00 am to 2:00 am daily on Freeview channel 35. 2:00 am QVC Beauty HD on Freeview channel 112 only broadcasts from 2:00 am to 4:00 am daily due to the channels over rating.

QVC Beauty HD ceased broadcasting on Freeview with the closure of the COM7 multiplex.

QVC HD, QVC Extra and QVC Style
QVC had planned to begin broadcasting in high-definition from September 2012, to be followed by the launch of two new 24-hour channels on Sky. On 11 February 2013 Sparkle TV and Twinkle TV launched on Sky. On 1 July 2013, Twinkle TV was renamed QVC Style. Sparkle TV became QVC Extra on 12 August 2013, with both channels added to Freesat. The following day saw the channels relaunch with availability expanded to Freeview via the connected red button on QVC Beauty. In July 2014, QVC Extra launched on Freeview channel 57, but closed in 2015, while QVC Style launched on Freeview channel 36 in August 2016, replacing QVC +1. QVC Style changed its hours to 2:00 am to 4:00 am on 31 March 2020, allowing QVC Beauty to extend its hours. On 21 April 2015, QVC +1 HD launched on Freeview channel 111, becoming the second high-definition timeshift service in the UK (after Channel 4 +1 HD). From 2016 to 2018, QVC Extra was temporarily rebranded as QVC Christmas. QVC Extra launched on Virgin Media on 27 July 2021. QVC HD ceased broadcasting on Freeview with the closure of the COM7 multiplex. QVC HD was later launched on Freesat and Sky in April 2022.

QVC Active
QVC Active was an interactive television service made accessible using the red button on QVC UK's cable, Sky and digital terrestrial services. Across each enhanced television platform, QVC provided information including a 24-hour TV Guide, bestselling products of that day and an ability for the viewer to interact with QVC UK's inventory. Customers viewing the Sky and cable TV platforms could buy products using their set-top box. On 13 August 2013, QVC Active closed as a result of more customers using mobile devices for ordering.

Operation in the UK
QVC UK operates from two main sites. From launch until June 2012, its headquarters and broadcasting facilities were at Marco Polo House, the former British Satellite Broadcasting headquarters in Battersea, London. These operations then moved to Chiswick Park, a 'campus'-style development on the site of a former derelict London Transport bus depot in West London. Its call centre and distribution warehouse is located in Kirkby, Knowsley, in Merseyside. These facilities were moved in 1998 from Liverpool's Harrington Dock. The company also has outlet stores in Warrington and Shrewsbury.

In June 2011, it was reported that QVC UK had begun carrying out trials of 3D broadcasting. This was merely an experiment, a spokesperson said.

The channel broadcasts live from 9:00 am to 1:00 am (the remainder being repeated content) year round. QVC UK claims a market penetration of 15.4 million homes on cable, satellite, and digital terrestrial TV. The Astra 2E footprint also takes in much of Western Europe. Retail sales for the year 2008 reached £360+ million.

Products
QVC organises its product range into nine distinct categories:

 Beauty
 Fashion
 Shoes & Accessories
 Jewellery
 Home & Kitchen
 Electronics
 Garden & Leisure
 Health & Wellbeing
 Gifts
QVC also stock a wide range of Christmas Products, with Christmas items available from July 25 when the Channel Celebrates "Christmas in July".

Current presenters

 Simon Biagi
 Charlie Brook
 Anne Dawson
 Annaliese Dayes
 Ophelia Dennis
 Chloe Everton
 Debbie Flint
 Dale Franklin
 Jill Franks
 Kathryn Goldsmith
 Pipa Gordon
 Will Gowing
 Jilly Halliday
 Catherine Huntley
 Jackie Kabler
 Alison Keenan
 Alex Kramer
 Miceal Murphy
 Eilidh Nairn
 Katy Pullinger
 Julia Roberts
 Craig Rowe
 Alison Young

Regular current guests

 Simon Browne
 Rylan Clark-Neal
 Amanda Holden 
 Richard Jackson
 Ruth Langsford
 Cait Penfold 
 Michael Perry
 Andi Peters
 Rosa Speyer
 Rick Stein 
 Gok Wan
 Lee Hohbein 
 Gail Samways
 James Murden 
 Leanne Stott
 Julien MacDonald
 Beverley Cressman
 Gill Gauntlett
 Lorna Ko
 Anne Dorrington
 Mark lane
 Lucy Piper

Past presenters

 Kara Baker
 Julian Ballantyne
 Sophia Barnes
 Jon Briggs
 Suzanne Evett
 Harry Greene
 Debbie Greenwood
 Anthony Heywood
 Katy John
 Paul Lavers
 Rob Locke
 Claudia Sylvester
 Kara Tritton
 Steve Whatley
 Carmel Thomas
 Anna Cookson
 Michaela Hyde
 Tim Goodwin
 Claire Sutton
 Kathy Tayler

References

External links
Official site

Shopping networks in the United Kingdom
Television channels and stations established in 1993
1993 establishments in the United Kingdom
UK